Otěšín is a small village in the municipality of Nalžovské Hory in the district of Klatovy, the Czech Republic, located about three kilometers south of Nalžovské Hory. A part of Otěšín lies in the cadastral territory of Miřenice with an area of 4.05 km2, while a part of Sedlečko lies in the cadastral territory of Otěšín. The Černíčský stream flows along the northeastern edge of the village.

History 

The first written mention of the village dates back to the year 1404.

References 

Populated places in Klatovy District